Juan Antonio López Moreno, commonly known as Juanín (born 6 October 1958), is a Spanish former professional footballer who played as a defender.

Club career
Juanín was born in Madrid. During his  professional career, spent in Segunda División and Segunda División B, he played for Atlético Madrid's reserves, Elche (two spells, the first on loan) and Granada. He later played for Albacete and Yeclano.

During his spell with Atlético Madrileño, Juanín won the 1983 Copa de la Liga for second level clubs.

References

1958 births
Living people
Footballers from Madrid
Spanish footballers
Atlético Madrid B players
Elche CF players
Granada CF footballers
Albacete Balompié players
Yeclano CF players
Segunda División players
Segunda División B players
Association football defenders